Urs Nussbaumer (2 October 1931 – 24 October 2022) was a Swiss agronomic engineer and politician. A member of the Christian Democratic People's Party, he served in the National Council from 1979 to 1991.

Nussbaumer died on 24 October 2022, at the age of 91.

References

1931 births
2022 deaths
20th-century Swiss engineers
Christian Democratic People's Party of Switzerland politicians
Members of the National Council (Switzerland)
ETH Zurich alumni
People from Gösgen District